Andrew Edington (January 15, 1914 – April 9, 1998) was an American football coach and college president. He served as the head football coach at Spring Hill College in 1937 and 1940.

Edington was the president of Schreiner College in Kerrville, Texas from 1950 to 1971.

Head coaching record

College

References

1914 births
1998 deaths
Rhodes Lynx football players
Spring Hill Badgers football coaches
High school football coaches in Alabama
University of Alabama alumni